A naval arms race is a situation in which two or more countries continuously construct warships that are consistently more powerful than warships built by the other country built in the previous years. These races often lead to high tension and near-wars, if not outright conflict.

Examples include:
The Austro-Italian ironclad arms race between the Kingdom of Italy and the Austrian Empire (and later Austria-Hungary) from 1860 to 1885.
The Argentine–Chilean naval arms race between Argentina and Chile from 1887 to 1902.
The South American dreadnought race between Argentina, Brazil and Chile from 1907 to 1914.
The World War I naval arms race between several powers, including Germany, the United Kingdom and Russia, culminating in World War I.
The World War II naval arms race, when Japan, America and Britain, after the Washington Naval Treaty, attempted to gain power in the Pacific.
The Cold War nuclear arms race between the United States and the Soviet Union, which involved both land and naval nuclear expansion.

References

Naval warfare
Technological races